Waldburg-Wolfegg was a County ruled by the House of Waldburg, located in southeastern Baden-Württemberg, Germany. Waldburg-Wolfegg was a partition of Waldburg-Wolfegg-Zeil and was repartitioned in 1667, creating Waldburg-Waldsee, which annexed Waldburg-Wolfegg in 1798 and became the principality of Waldburg-Wolfegg and Waldsee.

Counts of Waldburg-Wolfegg 
 Maximilian Franz Eusebius, 1667–81
 Ferdinand Louis, 1681–1735
 Joseph Franz, 1735–74
 Ferdinand, 1774–79
 Josef Alois, 1779–91
 Karl Eberhard Wunibald, 1791–98

1589 establishments in the Holy Roman Empire